Jolly is a 1998 Indian Tamil-language coming-of-age film directed by Dilipkumar and produced by R. B. Choudary. The film stars Abbas, Keerthi Reddy, Kausalya, Livingston and Khushbu, while S. P. Balasubrahmanyam and Janagaraj also appear in supporting roles. The film was released to a mixed response in May 1998. The film was partially reshot in Telugu with same name.

Cast

Abbas as Gowri Shankar
Keerthi Reddy as Chellama
Kausalya as Anitha
Livingston as Chakravarthy
Khushbu
Annapoorna as Gowri Shankar's mother
S. P. Balasubrahmanyam
Janagaraj
Vadivelu
Mansoor Ali Khan as Chakravarthy's father
Madhan Bob
Raja Ravindra
Haja Sheriff
Madhusudhan Rao (uncredited)

Production
Vignesh was originally meant to form a part of the cast, but was later dropped. Despite indications that Shiva would score the music, newcomer Kavi was given the opportunity.

Soundtrack
Soundtrack was composed by debutant Kavi.
Unnai Thotta Pattampoochi - Sujatha
Nandhavaname Nandhavaname - Hariharan, Swarnalatha
Idhu Vaazhkaiyil Thirunal (Friendship Day) - Unnikrishnan, Swarnalatha
Otha Kallu Mookuthi - K. S. Chithra, S. P. Sailaja, Arunmozhi
Jolly Sema Jolly - Mano, Febi Mani
Yele Yelo Nee AC Hall - Mano, Anuradha Sriram
A Plus B Square - S. P. Balasubrahmanyam
Ettukkum Pathukkum Idaiyilathan - Swarnalatha
Katchi Kodi Ellam Colora - Swarnalatha

Release
The film opened to below average reviews, with a critic labelling that "Livingston could probably be called the saving grace of the movie".

References

1998 films
1990s Tamil-language films
Indian coming-of-age films
Indian buddy films
1998 directorial debut films
1990s coming-of-age films
Super Good Films films